This is a list of schools in the Metropolitan Borough of Walsall, West Midlands, England.

State-funded schools

Primary schools 

Abbey Primary School, Bloxwich
All Saints National Academy, Bloxwich
Alumwell Infant School, Walsall
Alumwell Junior School, Walsall
Barcroft Primary School, Willenhall
Beacon Primary School, New Invention
Bentley West Primary School, Bentley
Birchills CE Community Academy, Walsall
Blackwood School, Streetly
Blakenall Heath Junior School, Blakenall Heath
Bloxwich Academy, Bloxwich
Blue Coat CE Infant School, Walsall
Blue Coat CE Junior School, Walsall
Brownhills West Primary School, Brownhills
Busill Jones Primary School, Bloxwich
Butts Primary School, Walsall
Caldmore Primary Academy, Walsall
Castlefort JMI School, Walsall Wood
Christ Church CE Primary School, Walsall
Chuckery Primary School, Walsall
Cooper and Jordan CE Primary School, Aldridge
County Bridge Primary School, Bentley
Croft Academy, Walsall
Delves Infant School, Walsall
Delves Junior School, Walsall
Edgar Stammers Primary Academy, Walsall
Elmore Green Primary School, Bloxwich
Fibbersley Park Academy, Willenhall
Goldsmith Primary Academy, Harden
Greenfield Primary School, Shelfield
Hillary Primary School, Pleck
Holy Trinity CE Primary School, Brownhills
Jubilee Academy Mossley, Bloxwich
King Charles Primary School, Bentley
Kings Hill Primary School, Darlaston
Leamore Primary School, Walsall
Leighswood School, Aldridge
Lindens Primary School, Streetly
Little Bloxwich CE Primary School, Bloxwich
Lodge Farm Primary School, Willenhall
Lower Farm Primary School, Bloxwich
Manor Primary School, Streetly
Meadow View JMI School, Great Barr
Millfield Primary School, Brownhills
Moorcroft Wood Primary School, Darlaston
New Invention Infant School, New Invention
New Invention Junior School, New Invention
North Walsall Primary Academy, Walsall
Old Church CE Primary School, Darlaston
Palfrey Infant School, Walsall
Palfrey Junior School, Walsall
Park Hall Infant Academy, Walsall
Park Hall Junior Academy, Walsall
Pelsall Village School, Pelsall
Pheasey Park Farm Primary School, Great Barr
Pinfold Street Primary School, Darlaston
Pool Hayes Primary School, Willenhall
Radleys Primary School, Rushall
Reedswood E-ACT Academy, Walsall
Rivers Primary Academy, Blakenall Heath
Rosedale CE Infant School, Short Heath
Rushall Primary School, Rushall
Ryders Hayes School, Pelsall
St Anne's RC Primary School, Streetly
St Bernadette's RC Primary School, Brownhills
St Francis RC Primary School, Shelfield
St Giles CE Primary School, Willenhall
St James Primary School, Brownhills
St John's CE Primary School, Walsall Wood
St Joseph's RC Primary School, Darlaston
St Mary of the Angels RC Primary School, Aldridge
St Mary's The Mount RC Primary School, Walsall
St Michael's CE Primary School, Pelsall
St Patrick's RC Primary School, Walsall
St Peter's RC Primary School, Bloxwich
St Thomas of Canterbury RC Primary School, Walsall
Salisbury Primary School, Darlaston
Short Heath Junior School, Short Heath
Sunshine Infant School, Walsall
Walsall Wood School, Walsall Wood
Watling Street Primary School, Brownhills
Whetstone Field Primary School, Aldridge
Whitehall Infant School, Walsall
Whitehall Junior Community School, Walsall
Woodlands Academy of Learning, Short Heath
Woods Bank Academy, Darlaston

Non-selective secondary schools 

Aldridge School, Aldridge
Barr Beacon School, Aldridge
Bloxwich Academy, Bloxwich
Blue Coat Church of England Academy, Walsall
Brownhills Ormiston Academy, Brownhills
Grace Academy, Darlaston
Joseph Leckie Academy, Walsall
Ormiston Shelfield Community Academy, Pelsall
Pool Hayes Academy, Willenhall
St Francis of Assisi Catholic College, Aldridge
St Thomas More Catholic School, Willenhall
Shire Oak Academy, Walsall Wood
The Streetly Academy, Streetly
Walsall Academy, Bloxwich
Walsall Studio School, Walsall
West Walsall E-ACT Academy, Walsall
Willenhall E-ACT Academy, Willenhall

Grammar schools 
Queen Mary's Grammar School, Walsall
Queen Mary's High School, Walsall

Special and alternative schools 

Castle School, Walsall
Elmwood School, Rushall
The Jane Lane School, Bentley
The Ladder School, Walsall
Mary Elliot School, Walsall
New Leaf Centre, Willenhall
Oakwood School, Walsall Wood
Old Hall School, Walsall
Phoenix Academy, Walsall
Shepwell Short Stay School, Willenhall

Further education 
Walsall College

Independent schools

Primary and preparatory schools 
Mayfield Preparatory School, Walsall

Senior and all-through schools 
Abu Bakr Boys School, Walsall
Abu Bakr Girls School, Walsall
Emmanuel School, Walsall
Hydesville Tower School, Walsall

Special and alternative schools 
Chase House School, Brownhills
West Midlands Education and Skills, Walsall

Walsall
Schools in Walsall